

48001–48100 

|-id=047
| 48047 Houghten ||  || Christopher Houghten (born 1963), from Rutland, Vermont, who developed a non-computer-based system to allow manually operated telescopes to be GOTO telescopes || 
|-id=070
| 48070 Zizza ||  || Frank Zizza, American associate professor of mathematics at the University of Arizona South and past president of the Huachuca Astronomy Club. He is credited with originating the idea of establishing an astronomical observatory on the university's campus in Sierra Vista. || 
|}

48101–48200 

|-id=159
| 48159 Saint-Véran || 2001 HY || Saint-Véran, the highest village in France, where the Observatoire de Saint-Véran is located || 
|-id=171
| 48171 Juza ||  || Karel Juza (1952–1994) was a Czech stellar astronomer who worked at the observatories in Valašské Meziříčí, Tatranská Lomnica, Skalnaté Pleso and Ondřejov. His studies concentrated on the eclipsing binary AR Aur and Be-stars. He died prematurely, just before finishing his Ph.D. thesis. || 
|-id=200
| 48200 Nishiokatakashi ||  || Takashi Nishioka (born 1936) contributed to the promotion and development of Japan's aerospace industry, such as leading the domestic production of commercial aircraft and initiating the privatization of rocket launch services. He is the chairman of the Japan Space Forum. || 
|}

48201–48300 

|-id=300
| 48300 Kronk ||  || Gary W. Kronk (born 1956) is an American amateur astronomer, programer-analyst and writer who was so inspired by comet C/1973 E1 (Kohoutek) as a teenager that he began a quest to catalogue every comet recorded in human history. Volume One (Ancient Comets to 1799) of his four-part Cometography was published in 1999. || 
|}

48301–48400 

|-id=373
| 48373 Gorgythion || 2161 T-3 || Gorgythion, from Greek mythology. He was the bastard son of Trojan king Priam, killed by an arrow shot by Teucer at Hector during the Trojan War. || 
|}

48401–48500 

|-id=410
| 48410 Kolmogorov ||  || Andrey Kolmogorov (1903–1987), a Russian academician, professor at the Moscow State University, and outstanding mathematician. || 
|-id=411
| 48411 Johnventre ||  || John Ventre (born 1935), a teacher, friend of the discoverer, meteorite expert, and Cincinnati Observatory Center historian || 
|-id=415
| 48415 Dehio || 1987 QT || Georg Dehio (1850–1932), German art historian who published the fundamental works The Church Architecture of the Occident (1884–1901), Handbook of the Monuments of German Art (1900–1912) and History of the German Arts (1919–1926). The handbook Dehio became a guide essential to amateurs. || 
|-id=416
| 48416 Carmelita ||  || Carmelita Miranda (born 1950), American astronomy popularizer who developed a love of astronomy while sailing the Pacific. She focused this passion into writing and presenting night-sky programs to over 25~000 children using a portable planetarium. She also demonstrated solar observations. || 
|-id=422
| 48422 Schrade ||  || Hugo Schrade (1900–1974), German optical engineer, employed by the firm Carl Zeiss Jena from 1929, became the highly esteemed head works manager during 1945–1966. || 
|-id=424
| 48424 Souchay ||  || Jean Souchay (born 1959), French astronomer, uncredited co-discoverer || 
|-id=425
| 48425 Tischendorf ||  || Constantin von Tischendorf (1815–1874), German theologian, discoverer of the 4th-century Codex Sinaiticus || 
|-id=434
| 48434 Maxbeckmann ||  || Max Beckmann, German-American painter and printmaker || 
|-id=435
| 48435 Jaspers ||  || Karl Jaspers, German-Swiss philosopher, physician, and political thinker language || 
|-id=447
| 48447 Hingley ||  || Peter D. Hingley (1951–2012), Librarian of the Royal Astronomical Society. || 
|-id=451
| 48451 Pichincha ||  || Pichincha is an active stratovolcano in Ecuador, very close to the capital Quito || 
|-id=456
| 48456 Wilhelmwien ||  || Wilhelm Wien, German physicist and Nobelist || 
|-id=457
| 48457 Joseffried ||  || Josef W. Fried (born 1948), a German astronomer at the Heidelberg Max-Planck-Institut für Astronomie. || 
|-id=458
| 48458 Merian ||  || Matthäus Merian, 17th-century Swiss engraver, etcher and book dealer || 
|-id=461
| 48461 Sabrinamaricia ||  || Sabrina Maricia Cohen (born 2005), daughter of American co-discoverer Seth M. Cohen. They have enjoyed many Palomar College planetarium visits together and now she can be part of the show. || 
|-id=471
| 48471 Orchiston ||  || New Zealander Wayne Orchistron (born 1943) works as an astronomer at the National Astronomical Research Institute of Thailand. His main interests lie in the field of history of astronomy. He is the author of many books and the co-founder and editor of the Journal of Astronomical History and Heritage. || 
|-id=472
| 48472 Mössbauer ||  || Rudolf Ludwig Mössbauer, German physicist and Nobelist || 
|-id=480
| 48480 Falk ||  || Johann Daniel Falk, German writer and social pedagogue, author of the Christmas carol O du fröhliche || 
|-id=482
| 48482 Oruki || 1992 CN || "Oruki", word in the Tosa (Kōchi Prefecture) dialect of Japanese, meaning "the importance of one's presence and reassurance of unflagging support" || 
|-id=492
| 48492 Utewielen ||  || Ute Wielen (born 1934) has worked in astronomy for more than 50 years. She was an assistant observer at the Babelsberg Observatory. She later worked as a programmer at astronomical institutes in Berlin and Heidelberg, and is the coauthor of many books on the history of astronomy. || 
|-id=495
| 48495 Ryugado || 1993 BB || Ryugado, Kōchi Prefecture, a Japanese limestone cave || 
|}

48501–48600 

|-id=529
| 48529 von Wrangel ||  || Baron Ferdinand von Wrange (1797–1870), a Baltic German explorer and one of the founders of the Russian Geographic Society. He studied glaciology, geomagnetics and climatology. Noticing swarms of birds flying northward from near the Kolyma river, he correctly deduced that there must be an island in the Arctic Ocean. || 
|-id=575
| 48575 Hawaii || 1994 NN || Hawaii, the Aloha State, was first visited by Polynesians from Tahiti, rediscovered by James Cook, and in 1959 became the fiftieth U.S. state. Hawaii became a sister state of Ehime prefecture || 
|-id=588
| 48588 Raschröder ||  || Rudolf Alexander Schröder (1878–1962), German architect, poet, essayist, and translator. The complete edition of his work contains eight volumes, including numerous collections of verse. He revived the Protestant chorale and is cofounder of the "Insel-Verlag". || 
|}

48601–48700 

|-id=607
| 48607 Yamagatatemodai ||  || Yamagata Tenmondai (Yamagata Astronomical Observatory), was established for educational purposes by the Yamagata University in 2003, using a 0.15-m refractor and a 3D astronomy theater. || 
|-id=619
| 48619 Jianli || 1995 KV || Jianli County, located in the south of Jianghan plain, has a long history and splendid culture, including many relics from the period of the Three Kingdoms of China. || 
|-id=624
| 48624 Sadayuki || 1995 PM || Sadayuki Okuni, Japanese high-school teacher with an interest in astronomy, nephew of the discoverer || 
|-id=628
| 48628 Janetfender || 1995 RD || Janet Fender, American chief scientist of the Space Vehicles Directorate of the AFRL, who instigated AMOS support for the NEAT program || 
|-id=631
| 48631 Hasantufan ||  || Hasan Tufan, Tatar poet || 
|-id=636
| 48636 Huangkun ||  || Kun Huang, academician of the Chinese Academy of Sciences || 
|-id=638
| 48638 Třebíč || 1995 TB || Třebíč, a town in Moravia, is known mainly for the Basilica of St. Procopius built in the early 13th century and the old Jewish Quarter. || 
|-id=640
| 48640 Eziobosso || 1995 UD || Ezio Bosso (born 1971), an Italian pianist, director and composer of classical music. || 
|-id=643
| 48643 Allen-Beach ||  || Bill Allen (born 1947) and Sally Beach (born 1950), American publishers of the Asteroid/Comet Connection (A/CC) † ‡ || 
|-id=650
| 48650 Kazanuniversity ||  || Kazan University, one of the oldest universities in Russia || 
|-id=681
| 48681 Zeilinger || 1996 BZ || Anton Zeilinger (born 1945), Austrian professor of physics. He is a much-honored professor of experimental physics in Innsbruck and Vienna, decorated by the "pour le mérite" for sciences and arts. Well known for his contributions to quantum physics, in 1997 he succeeded in the first teleportation of information on quantum level. || 
|-id=700
| 48700 Hanggao ||  || The Hangzhou High School that has made an outstanding contribution to national education since its foundation in 1889 in Hangzhou, Zhejiang province, China || 
|}

48701–48800 

|-id=715
| 48715 Balbinot ||  || Roberto Balbinot (born 1956) is an Italian theoretical physicist who teaches General Relativity at the Bologna University. His fields of research include acoustic black holes, quantum gravity, and field and string theories. || 
|-id=720
| 48720 Enricomentana ||  || Enrico Mentana (born 1955) is an Italian journalist and director of Italian TV video news. || 
|-id=736
| 48736 Ehime || 1997 DL || Ehime prefecture, Japan, the discovery site, sister state of Hawaii || 
|-id=737
| 48737 Cusinato ||  || Piergiorgio Cusinato, Italian antique dealer and amateur astronomer || 
|-id=756
| 48756 Yoshiharukuni ||  || Yoshiharu Okuni (born 1970), the eldest son of Japanese amateur astronomer Tomimaru Okuni, who discovered this minor planet. || 
|-id=767
| 48767 Skamander ||  || Skamander (Skamandros), a son of Zeus, fought on the side of the Trojans in the Trojan War and tried to kill Achilles three times. || 
|-id=774
| 48774 Anngower ||  || Ann C. Gower, a Canadian radio-astronomer and associate professor of astronomy at the University of Victoria. She is a gifted teacher who takes a special interest in every student in her classes, and an active member of the UVic Speakers Bureau, sharing with others her knowledge of galaxies and quasars. || 
|-id=778
| 48778 Shokoyukako || 1997 RE || Shoko and Yukako Abe, the discoverer's daughters || 
|-id=779
| 48779 Mariko || 1997 RH || Mariko Hamada (born 1964), a musician from Matsue-shi, Shimane-ken, Japan. || 
|-id=782
| 48782 Fierz ||  || Olga Fierz, Swiss teacher who dedicated all her life to the custody of children in difficult life situations || 
|-id=785
| 48785 Pitter ||  || Přemysl Pitter, Czech philanthropist and pacifist, holder of Czech, German and Israeli honors, and whose centenary was cited by UNESCO || 
|-id=794
| 48794 Stolzová ||  || Tereza Stolzová (1834–1902), was a Czech coloratura soprano and soloist for the Teatro la Scala in Milano. She belongs among the greatest singers of Verdi's works in the nineteenth century and created the title role on the European first night of Aida in 1872. || 
|-id=798
| 48798 Penghuanwu ||  || Peng Huanwu, Chinese theoretical physicist || 
|-id=799
| 48799 Tashikuergan ||  || Tashikuergan (meaning "Stone City") is an ancient city along the Silk Road at the western end in China. It is located on Pamir Plateau on the northern side of Kashi area, Xinjiang province, and it has been the only Tajik Autonomous County since 1954. || 
|}

48801–48900 

|-
| 48801 Penninger ||  || Josef Penninger (born 1964), Austrian  director of the Institute of Molecular Biotechnology of the Austrian Academy of Sciences, has been honored by various university chairs and numerous awards. He was chosen by the magazine Esquire as one of the ten most interesting people of the year 2000. || 
|-id=807
| 48807 Takahata ||  || Takahata, Yamagata prefecture, Japan || 
|-id=842
| 48842 Alexmazzanti ||  || Alessandro Mazzanti (born 1964), an Italian amateur astronomer and observer of near-Earth objects as well as the president of the astronomy club at Montelupo since 2020. || 
|-id=844
| 48844 Belloves || 1998 DW || Belloves or Bellovesus (c.a. 400 BC), was a Celtic prince and the first known Celt in the history of northern Italy mentioned by Livy. || 
|-id=886
| 48886 Jonanderson ||  || Jon Anderson (born 1944) is one of the founders of the progressive rock band Yes. He has also recorded many solo albums and collaborated with many musicians, including Vangelis and Mike Oldfield. His alto tenor voice is one of the most recognizable in the prog rock scene. || 
|-id=888
| 48888 REXIS ||  || REXIS, the Regolith X-ray Imaging Spectrometer aboard the OSIRIS-REx spacecraft, is the result of the work of over 100 students at the Massachusetts Institute of Technology and Harvard University who conceived, designed, implemented, and operated it at the asteroid (101955) Bennu. || 
|}

48901–49000 

|-id=909
| 48909 Laurake ||  || Laura ("Laurake") De Maeyer, daughter of Belgian psychologist Myriam Kerkhofs and Flemish sculptor Elmer De Maeyer || 
|-id=934
| 48934 Kočanová || 1998 QS || Mária Kočanová (1890–1976) was a Slovak writer, novelist and dramatist. She drew themes from contemporary life, European and world history or Bible stories. Her manuscripts are kept in a museum in Prešov. || 
|-id=960
| 48960 Clouet ||  || Bernard Clouet, general secretary of the Société astronomique de France (French Astronomical Society) and an observer of double stars || 
|}

References 

048001-049000